Jason Hook (born Thomas Jason Grinstead) is a Canadian guitarist, best known as the former lead guitarist of the heavy metal band Five Finger Death Punch.

Early life 
Born in Toronto, Ontario, Hook started his music career at the age of six in nearby Oakville with private guitar lessons. His early experience in formal music training also included drums, piano and violin.

Career 

Hook spent many years in Canada honing his craft and was eventually signed to Elektra with his band No Love Lost. The band recorded an album with producer Beau Hill in Los Angeles but the disc never saw the light of day. Now, on his own in Los Angeles as a session musician, Hook took a stint in the hard rock band BulletBoys. In 2000, he was hired by pop singer Hilary Duff as the guitarist in her live lineup; he also served as the session guitarist recording tracks for her. Hook also supported Mandy Moore on her 2001 tour. Hook became a highly coveted session player in the L.A. circuit and went on to tour and record with acts like the Vince Neil Band and Alice Cooper.

In 2007, Hook released his debut instrumental hard rock/metal album Safety Dunce. He recorded his second solo release, American Justice, in 2009, which featured guest appearances from Alice Cooper and members of Five Finger Death Punch.

In early 2009, it was announced that Hook was joining heavy metal band Five Finger Death Punch, replacing guitarist Darrell Roberts. On September 22, 2009, Hook and his bandmates released War Is the Answer, which landed them a number 7 debut on the Billboard Top 200 album. Five Finger Death Punch had great success in the following years including 14 number one songs and a total of 12 million albums sold worldwide. Some of the bands more popular hits were co-written by Hook, including "Inside Out", "Sham Pain", "Lift Me Up", "Battle Born", "A Little Bit Off", "Wash It All Away", "Coming Down", and "Remember Everything".

In 2019, Hook had emergency gallbladder surgery, which caused him to miss the remainder of Five Finger Death Punch's European tour. Guitarist Andy James of Sacred Mother Tongue replaced him for the remainder of the tour.

Hook left Five Finger Death Punch in February 2020. His departure was officially announced by the band in October, with Andy James permanently replacing him. In an interview in 2021, Hook said about his departure from the band, "As for the reason I'm leaving… well, there really isn't just one. I've been in bands my entire life and I feel like I've done all the good that I can here. It's time to pass the baton and move on to new challenges."

He is featured on Cory Marks's 2021 single "Blame It on the Double".

TV and film appearances 
Hook appeared on the History Channel's Counting Cars on July 9, 2013. His motorcycle had broken down on the side of the road and the show's star, Danny "The Count" Koker, “happened to” come along and helped get Hook's motorcycle running. Hook later appeared in the episode receiving an Ace Frehley tattoo at Koker's tattoo shop.

Hook also appeared in an episode of My Cat from Hell.

Hook appeared in the documentary film Hired Gun (2016).

Discography 
Monkeyhead
 2001: Monkeyhead

 Bulletboys
 2003: Sophie

Solo
 2007: Safety Dunce

Five Finger Death Punch
2009: War Is the Answer
2011: American Capitalist
2013: The Wrong Side of Heaven and the Righteous Side of Hell, Volume 1
2013: The Wrong Side of Heaven and the Righteous Side of Hell, Volume 2
2015: Got Your Six
2018: And Justice for None
2020: F8

References

External links 

Hook's official website
The Five Finger Death Punch official website

Living people
Canadian heavy metal guitarists
Canadian male guitarists
Musicians from Toronto
Five Finger Death Punch members
BulletBoys members
21st-century Canadian guitarists
21st-century American male musicians
Alice Cooper (band) members
Year of birth missing (living people)